The Kandam Kandath house (Kandam kandath joint-family) {Malayalam: Kandam kandath Tharavad} is one of the 16 remaining houses  of the 18 original houses (padinettu veedu) of the Mannadiar clan, which in turn is a subclan of the Kshatriya Nair caste.

Their primary language is Malayalam. The main ancestry and the present residence of most of the nuclear families belonging to the Kandam kandath house is the Pallanchathanur village in Palakkad district, Kerala.  The name 'Kandam kandath' is a portmanteau of two Malayalam words 'kandam', which means 'rice-field' and 'kandath', which means 'in a rice-field'. Therefore, the name 'Kandam kandath' indicates the fact that several earlier generations of this joint-family had possessed hundreds of acres of rice-field which would amount for more than half of the village of Pallanchathanur, which meant de facto that these Mannadiars were the official village-headmen of the Pallanchathanur village for over two hundred years.

References

Nair